The Citra Methodist Episcopal Church-South (also known as Citra United Methodist Church) is a historic church in Citra, Florida. It is located at 2010 NE 180th Street. On March 5, 1998, it was added to the U.S. National Register of Historic Places.

References

External links
 Marion County listings at National Register of Historic Places

United Methodist churches in Florida
National Register of Historic Places in Marion County, Florida
Churches on the National Register of Historic Places in Florida
Carpenter Gothic church buildings in Florida
Churches in Marion County, Florida